In geometric group theory, a graph of groups is an object consisting of a collection of groups indexed by the vertices and edges of a graph, together with a family of monomorphisms of the edge groups into the vertex groups.
There is a unique group, called the fundamental group, canonically associated to each finite connected graph of groups. It admits an orientation-preserving action on a tree: the original graph of groups can be recovered from the quotient graph and the stabilizer subgroups. This theory, commonly referred to as Bass–Serre theory, is due to the work of Hyman Bass and Jean-Pierre Serre.

Definition

Fundamental group

 if  is the edge  with the reverse orientation.

Also there is proved there a nice normal form for the elements of the fundamental groupoid. This includes normal form theorems for a free product with amalgamation and for an HNN extension .

Structure theorem
Let  be the fundamental group corresponding to the spanning tree . It is possible to define a graph with vertices and edges the disjoint union of all coset spaces  and  respectively. This graph is a tree, called the universal covering tree, on which  acts. It admits the graph  as fundamental domain. The graph of groups given by the stabilizer subgroups on the fundamental domain corresponds to the original graph of groups.

Examples
A graph of groups on a graph with one edge and two vertices corresponds to a free product with amalgamation.
A graph of groups on a single vertex with a loop corresponds to an HNN extension.

Generalisations
The simplest possible generalisation of a graph of groups is a 2-dimensional complex of groups. These are modeled on orbifolds arising from cocompact properly discontinuous actions of discrete groups on  simplicial complexes that have the structure of CAT(0) spaces. The quotient of the simplicial complex has finite stabilizer groups attached to vertices, edges and triangles together with monomorphisms for every inclusion of simplices. A complex of groups is said to be developable if it arises as the quotient of a CAT(0) simplicial complex. Developability is a non-positive curvature condition on the complex of groups: it can be verified locally by checking that all circuits occurring in the links of vertices have length at least six. Such complexes of groups originally arose in the theory of  Bruhat–Tits buildings; their
general definition and continued study have been inspired by the ideas of Gromov.

See also 
 Bass–Serre theory
 Right-angled Artin group

References 
.
.
.

.
. Translated by John Stillwell from "arbres, amalgames, SL2", written with the collaboration of Hyman Bass, 3rd edition, astérisque 46 (1983). See Chapter I.5.

Geometric group theory